Michael David Fortescue (born 8 August 1946) is a British-born linguist specializing in Arctic and native North American languages, including Kalaallisut, Inuktun, Chukchi and Nitinaht. He gained his PhD in Linguistics from the University of Edinburgh in 1978.

Fortescue is known for his reconstructions of the Eskimo–Aleut, Chukotko-Kamchatkan, Nivkh, and Wakashan proto-languages.

Education
He was educated at Abingdon School.

Career
He is professor emeritus of General Linguistics at the University of Copenhagen and chairman of the Linguistic Circle of Copenhagen. His Comparative Eskimo Dictionary, co-authored with Steven Jacobson and Lawrence Kaplan, is the standard work in its area, as is his Comparative Chukotko-Kamchatkan Dictionary. In his book Whiteheadian Linguistics, Fortescue explores the possibilities of a linguistic theory based on the philosophical theories of Alfred North Whitehead.

Selected works
A more complete listing is available in the Festschrift in his honor.
 1984. Some Problems Concerning the Correlation and Reconstruction of Eskimo and Aleut Mood Markers. Institut for Eskimologi, Københavns Universitet. 
 1990. From the Writings of the Greenlanders: Kalaallit Atuakklaannit. University of Alaska Press. 
 1991. Inuktun: An Introduction to the Language of Qaanaaq, Thule. Institut for eskimologis skriftrække, Københavns Universitet.
 1992. Editor. Layered Structure and Reference in a Functional Perspective. John Benjamins Publishing Co. 
 1994. With Steven Jacobson and Lawrence Kaplan. Comparative Eskimo Dictionary with Aleut Cognates. Alaska Native Language Center. 
 1998. Language Relations across Bering Strait: Reappraising the Archaeological and Linguistic Evidence. London and New York: Cassell. 
 2001. Pattern and Process: A Whiteheadian Perspective on Linguistics. John Benjamins Publishing Co. 
 2002. The Domain of Language. Copenhagen: Museum Tusculanum Press. 
 2005. Comparative Chukotko-Kamchatkan Dictionary. Berlin: Walter de Gruyter. 
 2007. Comparative Wakashan Dictionary. Munich: LINCOM Europa.
 2016. Comparative Nivkh Dictionary. Munich: LINCOM Europa.

References

 Michael David Fortescue, University of Copenhagen

See also
 Uralo-Siberian languages
 Proto-Eskimo–Aleut language
 Proto-Chukotko-Kamchatkan language
 List of Old Abingdonians

Historical linguists
Paleolinguists
Living people
Academic staff of the University of Copenhagen
1946 births
Linguists of Eskimo–Uralic languages
Linguists of Eskaleut languages
Linguists of Chukotko-Kamchatkan languages
Linguists of Nivkh languages
Linguists of Wakashan languages
People educated at Abingdon School
Eskimologists